Wißmannsdorf is a municipality in the district of Bitburg-Prüm, in Rhineland-Palatinate, western Germany.

The municipality is written with an ß, which may be replaced by ss if not available (Wissmannsdorf).

References

Bitburg-Prüm